Myrmecina wesselensis is a species of ant discovered and described by Shattuck, S. O. in 2009. This species is known from a single worker collected foraging on the ground at night from the Wessel Islands, Northern Territory.

References

Insects described in 2009
Myrmicinae
Hymenoptera of Australia